Capital punishment was abolished in Slovenia in 1989, when it was still a federal republic of Yugoslavia. When Slovenia introduced its democratic constitution on 23 December 1991, capital punishment became unconstitutional. On 1 July 1994, protocol 6 of the European Convention on Human Rights came into force. Later Slovenia also adopted the Second Optional Protocol to the International Covenant on Civil and Political Rights.

References
 https://web.archive.org/web/20050324105012/http://www.geocities.com/richard.clark32%40btinternet.com/europe.html

Penal system in Slovenia
Slovenia
Human rights abuses in Slovenia
Death in Slovenia
1991 disestablishments in Slovenia